Charles N. Mills (born 1961) is an American businessman, and the CEO of Medline Industries.

Early life
Mills is the son of James Stephen "Jim" Mills (1936-2019), who was the co-founder (with his brother Jon), and former CEO of Medline. Mills earned a bachelor's degree and an MBA, both from Cornell University.

Career
Mills has been CEO of Medline Industries since 1997, the fourth generation to run the company, founded in 1910. His cousin, Andy Mills is president, and Andy's brother-in-law Jim Abrams is COO.

Alongside his cousin and brother-in-law, Mills took over when the company had around half a billion sales. It is now worth approximately $3 billion, according to Forbes. His company has provided medical supplies during Hurricane Katrina, for which the company was awarded the American Red Cross, Hurricane Harvey, and during the Coronavirus pandemic.

References

1961 births
Living people
American chief executives
American lawyers
Cornell University alumni
Syracuse University alumni